Year 1392 (MCCCXCII) was a leap year starting on Monday (link will display full calendar) of the Julian calendar.

Events 
 January–December 
 June 13 – An assassination attempt by Pierre de Craon against Olivier de Clisson, Constable of France, fails.
 August 5
 General Yi Seong-gye crowns himself Taejo of Joseon, ending the Goryeo dynasty in the Korean Peninsula, and establishing the Joseon dynasty, which will last for more than 500 years.
 Charles VI of France (later known as "Charles the Mad") suffers a serious bout of psychosis, which will continue throughout his life.
 December 16 – Emperor Go-Kameyama of Japan abdicates in favor of rival claimant Go-Komatsu, in order to end the nanboku-cho period of conflict between the Northern and Southern imperial courts.

 Date unknown 
 King Jogaila of Poland and Lithuania appoints his cousin Vytautas the Great as regent of Lithuania, in return for Vytautas giving up his claim to the Lithuanian throne. Vytautas replaces Jogaila's unpopular brother Skirgaila as regent.
 Muhammed VII succeeds Yusuf II, as Nasrid Sultan of Granada (modern-day southern Spain).
 Franciscan friar James of Jülich is boiled alive, for impersonating a bishop and ordaining his own priests.
 Maria, Queen of Sicily defeats an army of rebel barons.
 William le Scrope succeeds William II de Montacute, as King of Mann.
 Seoan mac Pilib succeeds Tomas mor mac Mathghamhna as King of East Breifne, in north-central Ireland.
 The city of Afyonkarahisar (in modern-day western Turkey) is conquered by Sultan Beyazid I, of the Ottoman Empire.
 Louis de Valois is created first Duke of Orléans of the second creation.
 Erfurt University is founded in Erfurt, central Germany.
 Penistone Grammar School, later to be one of the first community comprehensive schools in England, is founded near Barnsley, England.

Births 
 January 10 – Johanna van Polanen, Dutch noblewoman (d. 1445)
 December 9 – Peter, Duke of Coimbra (d. 1449)
 date unknown
 Alain Chartier, French poet and political writer (approximate date; d. c. 1430)
 Flavio Biondo, Italian humanist and historian (d. 1463)
 Barbara of Cilli, Holy Roman Empress, queen consort of Hungary and Bohemia (d. 1451)
 John de Mowbray, 2nd Duke of Norfolk (d. 1432)
 John II of Luxembourg, Count of Ligny, French nobleman (d. 1441)
 Filippo Maria Visconti, Duke of Milan (d. 1447)
 Idris Imad al-Din, supreme leader of Tayyibi Isma'ilism, scholar and historian (d. 1468)

Deaths 
 March 25 – Hosokawa Yoriyuki, Japanese samurai
 April 26 – Jeong Mong-ju, Korean civil minister, diplomat and scholar (b. 1338) 
 May 17 – Zhu Biao, crown prince of the Ming dynasty, China (b. 1355)
 November 22 – Robert de Vere, Duke of Ireland (b. 1362)
 December 23 – Isabella of Castile, Duchess of York (b. 1355)
 date unknown
 Abbot Methodius of Peshnosha, Eastern Orthodox saint
 Lalleshwari, Kashmiri poet and mystic (b. 1320)
 Jeong Mong-ju, Goryeo diplomat and poet (b. 1337)

References